The Chinese mantis (Tenodera sinensis) is a species of mantis native to Asia and the nearby islands. In 1896, this species was accidentally introduced by a nursery tender at Mt. Airy near Philadelphia, United States. Tenodera sinensis often is erroneously referred to as Tenodera aridifolia sinensis because it was at first described as a subspecies of Tenodera aridifolia, but Tenodera sinensis is now established as a full species. 

Tenodera sinensis feeds primarily on other insects, though adult females sometimes catch small vertebrates. For example, they have been observed feeding on hornets, spiders, grasshoppers, katydids, small reptiles, amphibians, and even hummingbirds. Like most mantids, they are known to be cannibalistic. One study found that cannibalism occurs in up to 50% of matings. These mantids have been observed eating the larvae of monarch butterflies, while discarding the entrails.

Description

The Chinese mantis is a long, slender, brown and green praying mantis. Its color can vary from overall green to brown with a green lateral stripe on the borders of the front wings in the brown color form. In low light, the eyes of the mantis appear black, but in daylight appear to be clear, matching the color of the head. Chinese mantids look similar to another mantis species that has been introduced to the United States, the narrow-winged mantid (Tenodera angustipennis). Tenodera sinensis and Tenodera angustipennis are similar in appearance, however you can tell them apart by locating a spot in-between their front legs. If it is yellow then it is a Chinese mantis but if it is orange then it is a narrow-winged mantis. The oothecae are often affixed to vegetation such as bushes and small trees.

Native range
This mantis is native to China, Japan, the Korean Peninsula, Micronesia, and Thailand. Japanese 'Oo-kamakiri' ("large mantis") is known as Tenodera aridifolia, but this species can be considered T. sinensis.

Growth
Chinese mantises hatch in the spring, eat, grow, and molt through the summer, and lay eggs at the end of summer. When it gets too cold, they die, only living around a year long. First instar nymphs that eat less take a longer time to molt to the next instar and are smaller at the second instar than first instar nymphs that have been fed more.

Captivity
Tenodera sinensis is a common pet for mantis enthusiasts, and oothecae can be purchased from plant nurseries across the US.

Predators 
The Chinese mantis is preyed on by other mantises, birds, and the Asian giant hornet in its native range. The female mantis specifically preys on male mantises. She often kills and eats her male partner after mating, providing nutrition for her offspring Sexual cannibalism is a strange phenomenon not yet completely understood by scientists.

Similar species 
The European mantis (Mantis religiosa) and the Carolina mantis (Stagmomantis carolina) are both smaller mantises closely resembling the Chinese mantis. The European mantis is anywhere from tan to green in color and about 7.5 cm (3 in) long. The Carolina mantis, on the other hand, is only 6 cm (2.5 in) in length and varies more in color.

Culture 
There are two martial arts styles created to mimic the movements of the Chinese mantis. Developed in the Shandong province of China in the mid-1600s, Praying Mantis kung-fu is based on the quick movements and techniques of the Chinese mantis. An unrelated style of kung fu that was developed by the Hakka people in Southern China is known as Southern Praying Mantis.

Master Mantis, one of the supporting characters in the 2008 Dreamworks Animation film franchise Kung Fu Panda, is a Chinese mantis and one of the members of the Furious Five.

Gallery

See also 
 List of mantis genera and species

References

External links

Mantidae
Mantodea of Asia
Insects of China
Mantodea of North America
Insects described in 1871